Peter the Wild Boy (born c. 1713; died 22 February 1785) was a boy from Hanover in northern Germany who was found in 1725 living wild in the woods near Hamelin (Electorate of Hanover), the town of Pied Piper legend. The boy, of unknown parentage, had been living an entirely feral existence for an unknown length of time, surviving by eating forest flora; he walked on all fours, exhibited uncivilized behaviour and could not be taught to speak a language. He is now believed to have suffered from the very rare genetic disorder Pitt–Hopkins syndrome.

Peter was found in the Hertswold Forest by a party of hunters led by George I while on a visit to his Hanover homeland and brought to Great Britain in 1726 by order of his daughter-in-law Caroline of Ansbach, the Princess of Wales.

Life in London

After Peter's transportation to Britain, curiosity and speculation concerning Peter was excited in London. The craze was the subject of a biting satire by Jonathan Swift, and of another entitled The Most Wonderful Wonder that ever appeared to the Wonder of the British Nation, which has been attributed to Swift and John Arbuthnot. Daniel Defoe also wrote on the subject in his pamphlet Mere Nature Delineated. James Burnett, Lord Monboddo, in his Origin and Progress of Language presents Peter as an illustration of his theory of the evolution of the human species.

Caroline, Princess of Wales took an interest in Peter's welfare, and in 1726, after the initial public curiosity began to subside, she arranged for Dr Arbuthnot to oversee his education. All efforts to teach him to speak, read or write failed.

The interior designer and painter William Kent included a depiction of Peter in a large painting of King George I's court that today hangs on the east wall of the King's Staircase at Kensington Palace in London. Peter is shown wearing a green coat and holding oak leaves and acorns in his right hand.

Life in Northchurch

After he was discharged from the supervision of Dr Arbuthnot, he was entrusted to the care of Mrs. Titchbourn, one of the Queen's bedchamber women, with a handsome pension annexed to the charge. Mrs. Titchbourn usually spent a few weeks every summer at the house of Mr. James Fenn, a yeoman farmer, at Axter's End, in the parish of Northchurch, Hertfordshire. Peter was left there in the care of Mr. Fenn, who was allowed £35 a year for his support and maintenance. After the death of Mr. Fenn, Peter was transferred to the care of James's brother, Thomas, at another farmhouse, called Broadway, where he lived with the several successive tenants of that farm, and with the same government pension, to the time of his death.

In the late summer of 1751, Peter went missing from Broadway Farm and could not be traced. Advertisements were placed in newspapers offering a reward for his safe return. On 22 October 1751, a fire broke out in the parish of St Andrew's in Norwich. As the fire spread, the local gaol became engulfed in smoke and flame. The frightened inmates were hastily released and one aroused considerable curiosity on account of his remarkable appearance, excessively hirsute and strong, and the nature of the sounds he made, which led some to describe him as an orangutan. Some days later, he was identified as Peter the Wild Boy, possibly through a description of him in the  London Evening Post. He was returned to Thomas Fenn's farm, and had a special leather collar with his name and address made for him to wear in future, should he ever stray again.

Peter lived to an estimated 70 years of age. He was visited in 1782 by the Scottish philosopher and judge James Burnett and was said to have a healthy complexion with a full white beard and apparently understood what was said to him but was himself only capable of saying the words "Peter" and "King George" and humming a few songs. There is a portrait of the "Wild Boy", depicting a handsome old man with a white beard, in Caulfield's Portraits of Remarkable Persons.

Death and burial

Peter died 22 February 1785 and is buried in Northchurch. His grave can still be seen in the churchyard of St Mary's Church, Northchurch, directly outside the main door to the church.

On 20 February 2013, it was announced by the Department for Culture, Media and Sport that the grave was to be given Grade II listing on the advice of English Heritage.

In 2007, a blue heritage plaque was placed at the Wild Man pub in Bedford Street, near St Andrew's in Norwich, commemorating Peter and his association with the district.

Modern assessment
In 2011, the condition that afflicted Peter the Wild Boy was suspected to be the chromosomal disorder Pitt–Hopkins syndrome, a condition identified only in 1978, nearly 200 years after Peter's death. Various physical attributes of Peter's which are evident in the Kensington Palace portrait have been matched to the condition, such as his curvy "Cupid's bow" lips, his short stature, his coarse, curly hair, drooping eyelids and thick lips.

An item on the BBC Radio 4 programme Witness History broadcast in March 2011 examined the history of Peter the Wild Boy, tracing his life in Northchurch and later in Berkhamsted, where a leather and brass collar designed to identify Peter in case he should wander away from the village and inscribed "Peter the Wild Man" is preserved at Berkhamsted School.

See also
Feral child
Wild man
Pitt–Hopkins syndrome
James Burnett, Lord Monboddo

References

Further reading
James Burnett, Lord Monboddo, Of the Origin and Progress of Language (6 volumes, Edinburgh and London, J. Balfour and T. Cadell, 1773–1792), volume 1 (1773), pp. 173–174, 186  Retrieved 16 September 2013
James Burnett, Lord Monboddo, Antient Metaphysics (6 volumes, Edinburgh and London, Bell and Bradshute and T. Cadell, 1779–1799), volume 3 (1784), pp. 41, 57–67, 367–378  Retrieved 16 September 2013
James Burnett, Lord Monboddo, "Lord Monboddo's Account of Peter the Wild Boy" in John Walker (ed.), A Selection of Curious Articles from the Gentleman's Magazine (4 volumes, London, Longman, Hurst, Rees, Orme and Brown, 1811), volume 4, Appendix, pp. 581–584  Retrieved 16 September 2013
Henry Wilson, The Book of Wonderful Characters (London, J. C. Hotten, 1869), pp. 133–140  Retrieved 16 September 2013
Edward Dudley and Maximillian Novak (eds), The Wild Man Within: An Image in Western Thought from the Renaissance to Romanticism (Pittsburgh, Pa., University of Pittsburgh Press, 1972) 
Julia V. Douthwaite, "Homo ferus: Between Monster and Model", Eighteenth-Century Life, new series, volume 21, no. 2 (1997), pp. 176–202
Michael Newton, Savage Girls and Wild Boys: A History of Feral Children (London, Thomas Dunne Books/St Martin's Press, 2002; repr. London, Picador, 2004)
Julia V. Douthwaite, The Wild Girl, Natural Man, and the Monster: Dangerous Experiments in the Age of Enlightenment (Chicago, University of Chicago Press, 2002), pp. 21–28
Richard Nash, Wild Enlightenment: The Borders of Human Identity in the 18th Century (Charlottesville, Va., University of Virginia Press, 2003)
Serge Arolés, L'Enigme des enfants-loups: Une certitude biologique mais un déni des archives 1304–1954 (Paris, Editions Publibook, 2007), pp. 201–204
Roger Moorhouse, "Peter the Wild Boy", in History Today, April 2010, 
Stuart John McLaren, "Peter the Wild Boy", Norwich HEART Heritage Economic and Regeneration Trust (August 2010) Retrieved 16 September 2013
Lucy Worsley, Courtiers: The Secret History of Kensington Palace (London, Faber & Faber, 2011)
Maev Kennedy, "Peter the Wild Boy’s condition revealed 200 years after his death", Guardian, 20 March 2011. Retrieved 15 September 2013
Megan Lane, "Who was Peter the Wild Boy?", BBC News Magazine, 8 August 2011. Retrieved 15 September 2013
Robbie Gorr, "The Strange Life of Peter the Wild Boy", History Magazine, volume 21, no. 2 (December/January 2020), pp. 18–22.

External links
http://pitthopkins.org/
https://web.archive.org/web/20131003031705/http://www.marie-angelique.com/peter-the-wild-boy
http://www.historytoday.com/roger-moorhouse/peter-wild-boy

1710s births
1785 deaths

Year of birth uncertain
Burials in Hertfordshire
People from Hameln-Pyrmont
Feral children
People from Berkhamsted
People from the Electorate of Hanover